Karasyov, Karasyow or Karasev is an East Slavic male surname which is mostly to find in Russia. its feminine counterpart is Karasyova or Karaseva. It may refer to:

Alexander Karasyov (born 1971), Russian writer
Andrei Karasyov (born 1993), Russian association football player 
Andrey Karasyow (born 1991), Belarusian association football player 
Dmitri Karasyov (born 1992), Russian association football player
Felix Karasev, Russian KGB General and diplomat
 Nikolay Karasyov (athlete) (born 1939), Russian Olympic shot putter
 Nikolay Karasyov (rower) (born 1927), Russian Olympic rower
Pavel Karasyov (born 1992), Russian association football player
Sergei Karasev (born 1979), Russian association football referee
Sergey Karasev (born 1993), Russian basketball player
Valery Karasyov (born 1946), Russian gymnast
Vasily Karasev (born 1971), Russian basketball player
Marina Karaseva (born 1958), Russian musicologist
Olga Karasyova (born 1949), Russian former gymnast

References